This is a list of the federal institutions of Tanzania.

Legislative branch
 National Assembly of Tanzania

Executive branch

President of Tanzania
 John Magufuli 2015 - 2020
 President's Office, Planning Commission
 President's Office of Public Services Management

Vice President of Tanzania
 Samia Suluhu 2015-2020

Prime Minister of Tanzania
 Kassim Majaliwa 2015 - 2020

Other
 Nyalali Commission
 State House of Tanzania

Ministry of Agriculture, Livestock and Fisheries

Ministry of Works, Transport and Communication
 Air Tanzania
 Tanzania Airports Authority
 Tanzania Civil Aviation Authority
 Tanzania Government Flight Agency
 Tanzania Meteorological Agency
 Tanzania Ports Authority
 Tanzania Railways Corporation
 Tanzania Communication Regulatory Authority (TCRA)
 Tanzania Telecommunications Company Limited (TTCL)
 Tanzania Electric Supply Company Limited (TANESCO)

Ministry of Defence and National Service
 Tanzania People's Defence Force
 Army of Tanzania
 Navy of Tanzania
 Air Force of Tanzania

Ministry of Foreign Affairs, E.A.C, Regional and International Cooperation
 Diplomatic missions of Tanzania

Ministry of Energy and Minerals
 Tanzania Petroleum Development Corporation

Ministry of Finance and Planning
 Bank of Tanzania
 Economic and Social Research Foundation (ESRF)
 Parastatal Sector Reform Commission
 Public Service Pensions Fund (PSPF)
 National Social Security Fund (NSSF)
 Tanzania Revenue Authority (TRA)

Ministry of Health, Community Development, Gender, Seniors and Children
 Medical Stores Department
 National AIDS Control Programme
 Tanzania Commission for AIDS
 Tanzania Food and Drugs Authority (TFDA)

Ministry of Education, Science and Technology and Vocational Training
 Tanzania Atomic Energy Commission
 Tanzania Commission for Science and Technology

Ministry of Home Affairs

Ministry of Industry, Trade and Investment
 Board of External Trade
 Tanzania Chamber of Commerce, Industry and Agriculture
 Tanzania Investment Centre (TIC)

Ministry of Information, Culture, Artists and Sports
 Bagamoyo Art College
 Tanzania Football Federation

Ministry of Constitutional Affairs and Justice

Ministry of Lands, Housing and Human Settlements
 National Housing Corporation

Ministry of Natural Resources and Tourism
 National parks and protected areas
 Tanzania National Parks Authority (TANAPA)
 Tanzania Tourist Board (TTB)

Ministry of Water and Irrigation
 Water Resources Management Division
 Commercial Water Supply and Sewerage Services
 Community Water Supply
 Water Laboratory Unit
 Drilling and Dam Construction Agency

Judicial branch
 Court of Appeal of Tanzania
 Chief Justice of Tanzania
 Special Constitutional Court of the United Republic of Tanzania

Regions and districts
 Please see Regions of Tanzania and Districts of Tanzania.

Zanzibar
 President: Ali Mohamed Shein
 House of Representatives of Zanzibar
 Revolutionary Council (Zanzibar)

References

 Please see United Republic of Tanzania, Ministries.

See also
 Government of Tanzania
 Politics of Tanzania

Government of Tanzania
Politics of Tanzania
Political organisations based in Tanzania